Jimmy L. Smits (born July 9, 1955) is an American actor. He is best known for playing attorney Victor Sifuentes on the 1980s-1990s legal drama L.A. Law, NYPD Detective Bobby Simone on the 1990s-2000s police drama NYPD Blue, Matt Santos on the political drama The West Wing, and for appearing in Switch (1991), My Family (1995), The Jane Austen Book Club (2007), and In the Heights (2021). He also appeared as Bail Organa in the Star Wars franchise and as ADA Miguel Prado in Dexter. From 2012 to 2014, he joined the main cast of Sons of Anarchy as Nero Padilla. Smits also portrayed Elijah Strait in the NBC drama series Bluff City Law.

Early life
Smits was born in Brooklyn, New York. Smits's father, Cornelis Leendert Smits (1929–2015), was from Paramaribo, Suriname, and was of Dutch descent. Smits's mother, Emilina (née Pola; 1930–2015), was Puerto Rican, born in Peñuelas. He and his two sisters, Yvonne and Diana, grew up in a working-class neighborhood. When he was ten years old, he moved to Puerto Rico for a couple of years. Until then he did not speak Spanish. He described attending a Spanish-only school as "jarring" and "traumatic."

Smits was raised in a strict, devout Roman Catholic family. He identifies as Puerto Rican and frequently visits Puerto Rico.

Education
Smits was an athlete in his youth. He  graduated from Thomas Jefferson High School. He earned a bachelor's degree from Brooklyn College in 1980 and an MFA from Cornell University in 1982.

Career

One of Smits's early roles was playing Sonny Crockett's original partner on the first episode of Miami Vice in 1984. In the first five minutes of the episode he falls victim to a car bomb.

Beginning in 1986, Smits played Victor Sifuentes in the first five seasons of the NBC television Steven Bochco legal drama L.A. Law, for which he was nominated for six  Primetime Emmy Award for Outstanding Supporting Actor in a Drama Series, winning in 1990.

Additionally, Smits played a repairman on Pee-wee's Playhouse, and he starred in the multigenerational story of a Chicano family in the film My Family (1995), alongside Edward James Olmos and Jennifer Lopez.

One of Smits's most acclaimed roles was that of Detective Bobby Simone on the ABC television program NYPD Blue, in which he starred from 1994 to 1998. He received several Emmy nominations for his performance on the series and was reunited with his former co-star Dennis Franz at the 2016 Emmy Awards presentation. He won the ALMA award twice.

In 1999, Smits received the HOLA Award for Excellence from the Hispanic Organization of Latin Actors (HOLA).

Smits was scheduled to host the 2001 Latin Grammy Awards broadcast on September 11, 2001.  It was canceled due to continuous news coverage and out of respect for the victims of the terrorist attacks earlier that day. He did host a non-televised press conference to announce the winners.

Smits appeared as Senator Bail Organa of Alderaan in Star Wars: Episode II – Attack of the Clones (2002) and Star Wars: Episode III – Revenge of the Sith (2005), in which the character becomes Princess Leia's adoptive father. He reappeared as Bail Organa in the game Star Wars: The Force Unleashed (2008) and the spinoff movie Rogue One (2016). He later reprised the role for Obi-Wan Kenobi (2022).

Smits played the role of Congressman Matt Santos of Houston, Texas, in the final two seasons of the NBC television drama The West Wing, joining fellow L.A. Law alumnus John Spencer. His character eventually ran for and won the U.S. presidency.

In Dexter season 3, Smits played the role of Miguel Prado, an assistant district attorney who befriends the title character. Smits was nominated for an Emmy Award for Outstanding Guest Actor in a Drama Series for the role.

Additionally, Smits portrayed the character Alex Vega in the CBS TV series Cane, which aired from September 25, 2007, to December 18, 2007, and was subsequently canceled by the network due to the 2007 Screen Writer's Guild strike.

Smits joined the Sons of Anarchy cast in season 5 as Nero Padilla, a high-level pimp who refers to himself as a "companionator". He builds a relationship with Gemma Teller Morrow (Katey Sagal) and forms an alliance and mentorship with Gemma's son, the central character Jax Teller (Charlie Hunnam).

Smits starred in The Get Down, a musical drama television series which debuted in 2016 on Netflix.

On February 25, 2019, news outlets reported that Smits was cast as Elijah Strait in NBC drama series Bluff City Law and it was picked up to series on May 6, 2019.  Bluff City Law brings Smits back to TV courtrooms on a steady basis for the first time in over a quarter century since his role in L.A. Law.

In 2021, Smits played Kevin Rosario in the musical film In the Heights.

Stage performances

In the mid-1980s, Smits acted in numerous performances at the Hangar Theatre in Ithaca, New York, Cornell's summer repertory program. In 1982 at the Hangar his roles included Max in Cabaret, Paul in Loose Ends, and the lead in Pudd'nhead Wilson. Smits has participated in the Public Theater's New York Shakespeare Festival, playing the role of Duke Orsino in Twelfth Night in 2002 and Benedick in 'Much Ado about Nothing in 2004. In 2003, Smits starred in the Broadway production of the Pulitzer Prize-winning play, Anna in the Tropics, by Nilo Cruz, performed at the Royale Theatre. From November 2009 to February 2010, he appeared opposite Christine Lahti, Annie Potts, and Ken Stott in the critically lauded Broadway play God of Carnage, replacing Jeff Daniels. In December 2012 through March 2013, he appeared in Chicago in The Motherfucker with the Hat, at Steppenwolf Theatre Company.

Personal life
Smits was married to high school sweetheart, Barbara Smits (not maiden name), from 1981 until 1987. They have two children, Taina (born in 1975) and Joaquin (born in 1983). Since 1986, he has been in a relationship with actress Wanda De Jesus; they live together in Los Angeles.

Smits was arrested in 1987 for assaulting an officer after police answered a call for help at his home. His girlfriend De Jesus, who calls herself Juanita Cruz, began to attack the officers questioning her, Smits joined in and both were arrested for battery on the police officers who responded to the call. The charges were later dropped because of conflicting witness statements. He later pleaded guilty to the misdemeanor of disturbing the peace and was sentenced to 18 months of unsupervised probation, 50 hours of community service and a $150 fine. De Jesus pleaded guilty to misidentifying herself to a police officer and disturbing the peace. She was fined $250 and sentenced to 18 months of unsupervised probation and 75 hours of community service.

On June 4, 2021, he was awarded the 2,696th star on the Hollywood Walk of Fame.

Charity work and public service

Smits helped found the National Hispanic Foundation for the Arts  to advance the presence of Latinos in the media, telecommunications, and entertainment industries. He is also an advocate for diagnostic colorectal screening and has appeared in a public service commercial.  In 2010, he filmed a PSA for Detroit Non-Profit Cass Community Social Services and also served as the Honorary Chair of their 6th Annual "Catch the Fireworks With Cass" event.

Smits has also donated to several other organizations, including the Red Cross, New York Cares, and Stand up to Cancer.

Filmography

Film

Television

Video games

Awards and nominations

Smits also received the Ackerman Leadership Award for his work "championing bilingual and bicultural mental health and social services for Latino families."

See also
 List of Puerto Ricans

References

External links

 
 
 
 
 
 hispanic-today.com

1955 births
Living people
20th-century American male actors
21st-century American male actors
American male film actors
American male television actors
American male voice actors
American people of Dutch descent
American people of Puerto Rican descent
American people of Surinamese descent
Best Drama Actor Golden Globe (television) winners
Brooklyn College alumni
Cornell University alumni
Hispanic and Latino American male actors
Male actors from New York City
Outstanding Performance by a Supporting Actor in a Drama Series Primetime Emmy Award winners
People from Brooklyn
Puerto Rican people of Surinamese descent
Puerto Rican people of Dutch descent
Thomas Jefferson High School (Brooklyn) alumni
American Roman Catholics